is a Japanese unisex given name meaning "light" or "radiance".

Possible writings
Hikaru can be written using different kanji characters and can mean:
 光, "light"
 輝, "radiance"
The name can also be written in hiragana or katakana. It is more common for girls named Hikaru to only have hiragana in their name without kanji.

People with the name
 , Japanese gravure idol and tarento
 , Japanese performing artist and a former member of the Takarazuka Revue
 , Japanese classical composer, pianist and conductor
 , former Japanese soccer player
 , Japanese general
 , Japanese baseball player
 , Japanese professional wrestler
 Hikaru Kojima, (born 1994) Japanese association football player
 , Japanese electronic musician
 , member of Hinoi Team and Love & Peace
 , Japanese singer and member of the J-pop group Kalafina
 , Japanese voice actor
 , Japanese footballer
 , American chess Grandmaster
 , Japanese manga artist
 , Japanese women's footballer
 , Japanese J-pop singer and actress
 , Japanese snowboarder
 , Japanese admiral, the first female star officer of the Japan Self-Defense Forces
 , Japanese professional wrestler and mixed martial artist
 , Japanese professional wrestler and actress
 , Japanese gymnast
 , Japanese judoka
 , Japanese-American singer, songwriter, arranger, and producer
 , Japanese actress
 , Japanese ice hockey player
 , Japanese idol, singer, actor, songwriter, dancer, and member of Hey! Say! JUMP
 , Japanese idol, a member of Sakurazaka46
 , Japanese K-pop idol, a member of Kep1er

Fictional characters
 , a character in Parodius
 , a character in Shugo Chara!, aka Gozen
 , a character in Angelic Layer
 , a character in Princess Ai
 , a character in Seijuu Sentai Gingaman
 , a character in Ape Escape 2
 , a character in Martian Successor Nadesico
 , a character in Ranma ½
 , a character in Exo-Force
 , a character in Beyblade: Metal Fusion
 , a character in Hime-chan no Ribbon
 , also known as Cure Star, a character in Star Twinkle PreCure
 , a character in Time Patrol Tai Otasukeman
 , a character in Ouran High School Host Club
 , a character in Kimagure Orange Road
 , a character in Macross
 , a character in Kamen Rider Blade, the human guise of the Tiger Undead
 , a character in Choudenshi Bioman
 , a main character in Ani-Imo
 , a character in The Brave Fighter of Legend Da-Garn
 , a character in Grendizer
 , a character in Captain Tsubasa
 , a character in The Idolmaster Cinderella Girls
 , a character in Hot Gimmick
 , a character in Ultraman Ginga
 , a character in Magic Knight Rayearth
 , a character in Hikaru no Go
 , a character in Kirarin Revolution
 , a character in the Gyakuten Saiban manga
 , a character in Codename wa Sailor V
 Hikaru Sulu, a character in Star Trek
 Hikaru Tonetti (ヒカル), a character in School House
 , a character in Di Gi Charat
 , the main character within Otogizōshi
 Hikaru Genji, a character in The Tale of Genji
 Sungel/Sunjiel (aka MagiShine), of Mahou Sentai Magiranger (often referred to as "Hikaru-sensei")
 The Figure Hikaru of Figure 17
  Thunder Warrior Hikaru of Seijuu Sentai Gingaman

Other uses 

 Sega Hikaru, an arcade game platform
 Sony Ericsson W995, previously known as Hikaru

Japanese unisex given names